Tommy Norman (born August 22, 1972, in the Levy section of North Little Rock, Arkansas) is a longtime patrolman/officer who has worked for the North Little Rock Police Department since 1998. Norman has received national attention for his actions concerning the people of his community, most notably his charitable actions toward the youth within his jurisdiction.On October 15, 2021, it was announced that President Joe Biden will be presenting Officer Norman with the Presidential Lifetime Achievement Award, a highly honorable award given to those who give back to their communities through volunteerism.

Early life and education
Norman was born to parents Modena and Dean Norman, and he graduated from Ole Main High School in 1990. Between 1991 and 1998, he worked many jobs in the nursing and mental health field. He worked as a Certified Nursing Assistant at Riley's Oak Hill Manor Nursing Home. Norman was also a mental health worker at Pinnacle Point Hospital.

Norman has three children and eight siblings.

Career
Norman is known for positive community policing. Norman's unorthodox approach to policing includes thousands of video posts, pictures  and daily interactive engagement at the Boys & Girls Clubs and the Police Athletic League with those that he protects and serves. He is credited for doing things like presenting 50 NLRSD students with backpacks and $50 gift cards from Shoe Carnival in August to purchase shoes, starting the “Shop with a Cop” program to help financially struggling students or just dancing with the children.

National reception
Norman has gained national and international attention for his unconventional methods of law enforcement. The national and international exposé of Tommy Norman came from a televised CNN News cable program on May 10, 2015, during an interview on Newsroom with its host Brooke Baldwin and her guest Atlanta activist and rapper Killer Mike. Killer Mike professed that Norman is "doing something right" and that is connecting with inner city youth, in particular minority communities of color.

He was also featured on the The Today Show on November 8, 2015. This report featured some of the day-to-day activities he does with the neighborhood and specifically how he is well liked by children. Reporter Kerry Sanders has coined the term “Social Media Cop” for him.

References

External links 
Arkansas Matters
Goodnews Blog
MTV News
Worldstar Hip Hop

1972 births
People from North Little Rock, Arkansas
Living people